Bela Vista Futebol Clube is a Brazilian football team from the city of São Gonçalo, Rio de Janeiro state, founded on May 10, 1977 in the city of Niterói.

Stadium
The home stadium Alziro Almeida has a capacity of 4,000 people. The stadium is also known as Alzirão.

Colors
The official colors are red and white.

External links
Bela Vista at FFERJ

Association football clubs established in 1977
Football clubs in Rio de Janeiro (state)
1977 establishments in Brazil